The Skoda houfnice vz 14 ("Howitzer model 1914") and Skoda houfnice vz 14/19 ("Howitzer model 1914/1919") were 100 mm (3.93-inch) field howitzers made in Czechoslovakia by the Skoda works.

Skoda houfnice vz 14

The Skoda houfnice vz 14 was created in 1914. It was used by the Austro-Hungarian Army during World War I. Large numbers of the howitzers were acquired by Italy after the break-up of the Austro-Hungarian Empire in 1918.

Statistics

Caliber: 100mm
Length of Piece: 1.93 m [L/19 Calibres or 76 inches]
Weight: ? kg. (When Travelling); 1350 kg. (In Action). 
Range: 8,400 m 
Traverse: 6°  
Elevation: -8° to +50°
Weight of Shell: 14 kg.

Other designations

Called the Obice da 100/17 modelo 14 in Italian service from 1919 to 1943.
Called the 10 cm M. 14 Feldhaubitze ("100mm Model 1914 Field Howitzer") in Austro-Hungarian service from 1914 to 1918.
Called the 10cm leichte Feld-Haubitze 315 (Italienische) or 10cm leFH315(i) ("100m Light Field Howitzer No.315 (Italian)") in German service during World War Two from 1943 to 1945.

Skoda houfnice vz 14/19

An improved version of the howitzer was created in 1919. The main improvement was a longer barrel offering greater range that which could be mounted in the old howitzer beds. 

The improved howitzer was sold to Poland, Hungary, Yugoslavia and Greece before 1938. Some versions had rubber tires so they could be pulled by trucks but most retained wooden spoked wheels so they could be pulled by mule teams. The howitzer was also manufactured in Poland in Starachowice as wz.1914/19P howitzer.

Germany captured a large number of Skoda houfnices when they conquered Poland and absorbed Czechoslovakia. They later seized additional guns while fighting in Italy, Hungary, Yugoslavia and Greece. Due to their age, the howitzers were relegated to second line service and incorporated into defensive lines and fortifications after 1942.

Statistics

Caliber: 100mm
Length of Piece: 2.4 m [L/24 Calibres or 94.5 inches]
Weight: 2025 kg. (When Travelling); 1505 kg. (In Action). 
Range: 9970 m 
Traverse: 5.5°  
Elevation: - 7.5° to + 48°
Weight of Shell: 14 kg.

Other designations
Called the Obice da 100/22 modello 14/19 in Italian service. In 1941 Germany sold about 350 howitzers as war prizes coming from Czechoslovakia and Poland.
Called the haubica 100 mm wz. 1914/19A or wz. 1914/19P in Poland.
Captured Polish models were designated 10 cm leFH 14/19(p), called the 10 cm leichte Feld-Haubitze 14/19 (Tschechische) or 10 cm leFH 14/19(t) ("100m Light Field Howitzer 14/19 (Czechoslovakian)") in German service during World War Two from 1938 to 1945, Yugoslavian models were designated 10 cm leFH 316(j) and  Greek models were designated 10 cm leFH 318(g).

Sources

Chris Bishop (editor). The encyclopedia of weapons of World War II: The comprehensive guide to over 1,500 weapon systems, including small arms, artillery, tanks, ships, submarines and warplanes. Metrobooks (2002) p. 142.

Artillery of Czechoslovakia
100 mm artillery
Howitzers
World War II artillery of Greece